Iona Station (Bobier Strip) Aerodrome  is a private aerodrome located  southwest of Iona Station, Ontario, Canada.

References

Registered aerodromes in Elgin County